Zirkuh County is in South Khorasan province, Iran. The capital of the county is the city of Hajjiabad. At the 2006 census, the region's population (as Zirkuh and Zohan Districts of Qaen County) was 38,129 in 9,339 households. The following census in 2011 counted 41,081 people in 10,973 households. At the 2016 census the county's population was 40,155 in 11,178 households, by which time the districts had been separated from the county to become Zirkuh County.

Administrative divisions

The population history and structural changes of Zirkuh County's administrative divisions over three consecutive censuses are shown in the following table. The latest census shows three districts, six rural districts, and two cities.

References

 

Counties of South Khorasan Province